The Walther LG400 is an air rifle first introduced in 2010 as the successor to the 
Walther LG300. It is a PCP (pre-charged pneumatic) powered by compressed air from a removable air cylinder. It was designed as a 10 metre air rifle for indoor competition use. It has been successfully modified to 16 Joule of kinetic energy for Field Target (FT)  and Hunter Field Target (HFT)  outdoor use.

As of March 2019 Walther builds and sells the 16 Joule / 12 footpound Field Target version of its LG400. Some 5 years after several shooters from Estonia, South Africa and The Netherlands started converting the LG400 from 7.5 to 16 Joule themselves Walther has finally released their new field target rifle. 
 

During these 5 years Walther has done some extensive field testing of the LG400 Field Target. A few chosen German field target shooters have used the rifle and shared their findings with the Walther designers and engineers.

The LG 400 Field Target is available with a choice of aluminum and wooden stocks. It is also available as just the barreled action. So you can add your own custom stock.

The main differences with the 7.5 Joule versions of the LG400 are:

 16 Joule LG300 type pressure regulator
 56,5 centimeter long barrel (compared to 42 cm for the 7.5 joule version)
 The air cylinder is of the so called 'Maxi' type: Volume 267 cm3.  Length: 460 mm. Weight: 930 gram (compared to 460 gram for the standard 385mm aluminium cylinder).
 The special barrel end tube that has a cone inside and acts like an air stripper or muzzle brake.
 The Alutec stock has a special type of barrel band up front.
 It does not have the Absorber or Equalizer

Prices and options can be found on the Walther website:

https://www.carl-walther.de/produkte/sportwaffen/luftgewehre.html

References 

3. https://airgunaccuracy.wordpress.com/the-factory-walther-lg-400-field-target/
4. https://www.carl-walther.de/produkte/sportwaffen/luftgewehre/2825724.html
5. https://www.carl-walther.de/produkte/sportwaffen/luftgewehre/2833336.html

External links 
 Carl Walther, official website (German)
 Carl Walther, official website (English)

Air guns
Pneumatic weapons